Arasawa No.2 Dam  is a rockfill dam located in Iwate Prefecture in Japan. The dam is used for flood control. The catchment area of the dam is 12 km2. The dam impounds about 12  ha of land when full and can store 899 thousand cubic meters of water. The construction of the dam was started on 1973 and completed in 1989.

See also
List of dams in Japan

References

Dams in Iwate Prefecture